Cyril Baudouin is a French rugby league footballer who represented France at the 1995 World Cup.

Playing career
Playing for the Carpentras XIII club, Baudouin represented France Under-21s in 1993.

The next year he made his test debut for France, playing against Fiji. He was part of the French side at the 1995 World Cup, playing in two matches.

References

Living people
French rugby league players
France national rugby league team players
Rugby league second-rows
RC Carpentras XIII players
Year of birth missing (living people)
Place of birth missing (living people)